Julie James (born February 1958) is a Welsh Labour politician, serving as Minister for Climate Change since 2021. James has been the Member of the Senedd (MS) for Swansea West since 2011. She served as Minister for Housing and Local Government from 2018 to 2021.

Early life
James was born in Swansea, and was raised in various places around the world with her family. Her parents had married young, and they did not have more children until she was 8. Her sister, 8 years younger, lives in Swansea and her brother, 13 years younger, is the musician Richard D James (known as Aphex Twin). At the age of sixteen she joined the Labour Party and was the first of her family to study at university.

Professional career
James first studied American Studies & History at University of Sussex, graduating in 1980. She then studied law at the Polytechnic of Central London, graduating in 1982, then went on to the Inns of Court School of Law in London to train as a barrister, passing the bar in 1983.

Her career started working as a policy lawyer with the London Borough of Camden. She then moved back to Swansea to raise her three children and start work for West Glamorgan County Council as the Assistant County Secretary (Legal Services).

James later worked for the City and County of Swansea Council, where her final post was Assistant Chief Executive (Governance). She left of her own accord at the signing of a contract by the Liberal Democrats which she 'thought' to have wasted "millions of pounds". She went on to join the law practice Clarkslegal LLP, specialising in environmental and constitutional law.

Political career

On 5 May 2011, James was elected as Assembly Member representing Swansea West.

She sat on several committees, including the Constitutional and Legislative Affairs Committee, Enterprise and Business Committee and Environment and Sustainability Committee. She has chaired the procurement and common fisheries task and finish groups.

On 11 September 2014, she was appointed Deputy Minister for Skills and Technology during a reshuffle by Carwyn Jones, replacing Ken Skates who was appointed Deputy Minister for Culture, Sport and Tourism.

On 5 May 2016, James was re-elected as the Assembly Member for Swansea West by a higher majority than her previous term and was tipped at the time to be a likely candidate for a cabinet position.

On 3 November 2017, she was promoted to the Cabinet as Leader of the House & Chief Whip.

On 13 December 2018, following the election of Mark Drakeford to the position of leader of Welsh Labour and therefore First Minister, James was appointed Minister for Housing and Local Government.

References

External links
 National Assembly for Wales
 Political office website
 Election campaign website
 Welsh Labour profile

Offices held

1957 births
Living people
Welsh Labour members of the Senedd
Wales AMs 2011–2016
Wales MSs 2021–2026
Politicians from Swansea